Kingsland School is a pupil referral unit located on Broadbent Road, Watersheddings, Oldham.

Kingsland School supports pupils, aged between 10 and 16, who are unable to access mainstream school, including those with behaviour problems, or have been permanently excluded, or those who cannot attend for medical reasons. In July 2009 the school was deemed to be "outstanding" by board inspectors.

References

Special secondary schools in England
Education in Oldham
Alternative schools in England
Schools in Oldham
Special schools in the Metropolitan Borough of Oldham